Best of the Best 4: Without Warning is a 1998 direct-to-video martial arts-action film written and directed by the film's star, Phillip Rhee. It is the third sequel in the Best of the Best film series. The film co-stars Ernie Hudson, Tobin Bell, Paul Gleason, and Sven-Ole Thorsen.

Plot
A group of Russian mobsters have stolen a huge supply of paper for printing U.S. currency, and are now flooding the market with counterfeit bills. When a young woman named Mickey (Jill Ritchie) working for the mobsters decides to turn herself in and hand over a data CD to the police, she is shot and killed, but not before handing the disc to an unsuspecting Tommy Lee (Phillip Rhee). Despite working with the police as a martial arts instructor, Lee doesn't go to the cops with the disc, but instead goes on the run, giving the mafia time to kidnap his daughter Stephanie (Jessica Huang) to hold as a hostage in exchange for the disc. When Lee catches the mobsters fleeing in a C130, he raises himself on a fire engine and casts the mobster's own bomb into the plane as landing gear doors close.

Cast
 Phillip Rhee as Tommy Lee
 Ernie Hudson as Detective Gresko
 Tobin Bell as Lukasz Slava
 Paul Gleason as Father Gil
 Art LaFleur as "Big Joolie"
 Jessica Collins as Karina
 Chris Lemmon as Detective Jack Jarvis
 Sven-Ole Thorsen as Boris
 Jessica Huang as Stephanie Lee
 Thure Riefenstein as Yuri Slava
 Jill Ritchie as Mickey, Big Joolie's Daughter
 Ilia Volok as Ilia
 Garrett Warren as Viktor
 David Fralick as Oleg
 Monte Perlin as Sergi
 Shauna O'Brien as Yuri's Girl (uncredited)
 Amy Rhee as Tommy's Wife (uncredited)

External links
 

1998 direct-to-video films
1998 martial arts films
1998 films
1998 action films
American action films
American martial arts films
Films about Korean Americans
Buena Vista Home Entertainment direct-to-video films
Taekwondo films
Hapkido films
Direct-to-video sequel films
1990s English-language films
American direct-to-video films
Best of the Best (film series)
Films directed by Phillip Rhee
1990s American films